Pelham Country Club is a country club located in Pelham Manor in Westchester County, New York. The club hosted the PGA Championship in 1923, in which Gene Sarazen defeated Walter Hagen after 38 holes of play.

History
In 1900, Dr. Charles Ripley Gillett and his brother bought clubs and balls, planted cans in the ground of a cow pasture and proceeded to teach themselves the game of golf, which had recently been introduced into the United States from Scotland. Soon after, the first Pelham Country Club was formed. This club laid out a nine-hole course on the rolling meadows known as the 'Carson Place'. Dr. Edward P. Fowler of New York City bought the Carson place as a summer home. He lived in the farmhouse and rented the grounds to the Pelham Country Club for a golf course.

After some time Dr. Fowler decided to divide his property and the club had to look for a new home. The members explored the possibilities of the Disbrow Farm located far out in the rural northern end of New Rochelle. It comprised 180 acres of level land, which had been under cultivation for several years. After much discussion, the Pelham Country Club made the move to what would then be called the 'Wykagyl Golf Club'.

A few years later Mr. George Phelps started another Pelham Country Club. In 1908 the members decided to expand their club quarters and in 1919 it was decided to convert the Country Club into a Golf Club. Devereux Emmet a noted golf architect from Pelham, NY, was commissioned to lay out the 18-hole course. Construction was started in 1920, and the course was ready by July 1921.

The official opening of the golf course was on July 11–12, 1921, when the British Open Golf Champion Jock Hutchison, and the English golf stars Abe Mitchell and George Duncan played the course with an immense gallery following them. In September 1923, the PGA Championship was played at Pelham Country Club with golf's most prominent players participating. Gene Sarazen and Walter Hagen stole the show, when they finished even-up in the 3-hold final, and went on to extra holes.

References

External links 
 Official site

Pelham, New York
Geography of New Rochelle, New York
Sports in New Rochelle, New York
Golf clubs and courses in New York (state)
Sports venues in Westchester County, New York
Golf clubs and courses designed by Devereux Emmet
1921 establishments in New York (state)